Air Command is a term used to refer to the command structure of some air forces. Examples include:

 Allied Air Command (NATO)
 Royal Canadian Air Force, known as Air Command from 1968 to 2011
 RAAF Air Command (Australia)
 RAF Air Command (United Kingdom)
 Air Combat Command (United States Air Force)

Military terminology